Kazimierzów  is a village in the administrative district of Gmina Paradyż, within Opoczno County, Łódź Voivodeship, in central Poland.

Notable people
 

Jerzy Zieliński (1943–1980), painter and poet

References

Villages in Opoczno County